A main course is the featured or primary dish in a meal consisting of several courses. It usually follows the entrée ("entry") course.

Usage
In the United States and Canada (except Quebec), the main course is traditionally called an "entrée". English-speaking Québécois follow the modern French use of the term entrée to refer to a dish served before the main course.

According to linguist Dan Jurafsky, North American usage ("entrée") retains the original French meaning of a substantial meat course.

See also

 Full course dinner

References

Bibliography

External links
 Wikibooks Cookbook

Food and drink terminology
Courses (food)

tl:Ulam